Tetradia is a monotypic beetle genus in the family Cerambycidae described by Thomson in 1864. Its only species, Tetradia lophoptera, was described by Félix Édouard Guérin-Méneville in 1844.

References

Crossotini
Beetles described in 1844
Monotypic beetle genera